Ust-Antose is a rural locality (a settlement) in Bauntovsky District, Republic of Buryatia, Russia. The population was 4 as of 2010.

Geography 
Ust-Antose is located 79 km southwest of Bagdarin (the district's administrative centre) by road.

References 

Rural localities in Bauntovsky District